Dhadhare is a village in thane district, Maharashtra, India. Zilla parishad is the main source of schooling there. The main water source is Shai river.

Occupation
The main occupation of people in this village is agriculture, mostly rice. The rock quarry business is also a backbone of the economy in this area.

References

Cities and towns in Kolhapur district